This is a list of all personnel changes that occurred during the 2015 Women's National Basketball League (WNBL) off-season and 2015–16 WNBL season.

Incoming Player Movement

Re-signings

Internal signings

New signings

  ''DeNesha Stallworth was released from the SEQ Stars mid-season and later signed by the Canberra Capitals.

Released signings

Outgoing Player Movement

Retirement

Going overseas

Coaching changes

References

2015–16 WNBL season
Women's National Basketball League lists